819 Barnardiana is a minor planet orbiting the Sun, discovered on March 3, 1916, by the German astronomer Max Wolf in Heidelberg.

References

External links
 
 

000819
Discoveries by Max Wolf
Named minor planets
000819
19160303